Monte Zebio is a mountain of the Veneto, Italy. The mountain was an important stronghold for the Austro-Hungarian defensive line during World War I.

References

Mountains of the Alps
Mountains of Veneto